Oleg Shapovalov (16 February 1963 – 6 August 2021) was a Ukrainian politician. A member of the Party of Regions, he served as President of the Kharkiv Oblast Council from 2005 to 2006.

Biography
Shapovalov was born on 16 February 1963 ,in Izium. In 1986, he graduated from the Kharkiv Petro Vasylenko National Technical University of Agriculture with a degree in mechanical engineering. In 1988, he began working for Komsomol as the group's first secretary in Izium. In 1996, he earned a degree in finance from the National University of Kharkiv. In July 1997, he started working for the  before directing a gas complex in Bezliudivka.

On 15 February 2005, Shapovalov was elected President of the Kharkiv Oblast Council, serving until 28 April 2006. On 26 March 2006, he was elected as a deputy in the Council. In July 2006, he was appointed Deputy Chairman of the Kharkiv Regional State Administration. He was dismissed in January 2009 and became general director of an electric plant in Kharkiv. On 31 October 2010, he was re-elected to the Kharkiv Oblast Council and served as Chairman of the Standing Committee on Fuel and Energy, Housing and Communal Services, Industry, Construction, Transport, Roads and Communications.

Oleg Shapovalov died on 6 August 2021, at the age of 58.

Distinctions
Knight of the Order of Merit (2003)
Medal of the Verkhovna Rada (2005)
Honorary Award of the Kharkiv Oblast Council (2009)
President of the Kharkiv Regional Parachute Federation
President of the

References

1963 births
2021 deaths
Party of Regions politicians
People from Izyumsky Uyezd
Local politicians in Ukraine
Kharkiv Petro Vasylenko National Technical University of Agriculture alumni
National University of Kharkiv alumni
Chevaliers of the Order of Merit (Ukraine)
Laureates of the Diploma of the Verkhovna Rada of Ukraine